Lawrence Kadoorie, Baron Kadoorie, CBE (2 June 1899 – 25 August 1993) was a Hong Kong industrialist, hotelier, photographer and philanthropist.

Biography
Lawrence Kadoorie was born to a Baghdadi-Jewish family from Bombay, India. He was the older child of Laura (née Mocatta) and Sir Elly Kadoorie. His brother, Horace Kadoorie (1902–1995), would become his partner in the family business.

In 1981, Lawrence Kadoorie became the first Hong Kong born person to be elevated to the peerage as a life peer with the title and style of Baron, and to have become a member of the House of Lords.

His uncle was Sir Ellis Kadoorie. His family were originally Mizrahi Jews from Baghdad who later migrated to Bombay (Mumbai), India in the mid-eighteenth century. He was educated at Clifton College. Kadoorie and his brother Sir Horace Kadoorie worked for Victor Sassoon during the 1920s and 1930s, and managed his famous Shanghai hotel. They also worked for their father Sir Elly Kadoorie.

Awards and philanthropy
Kadoorie was made a CBE in 1970, knighted in 1974 and created Baron Kadoorie, of Kowloon in Hong Kong and of the City of Westminster on 22 September 1981 for his philanthropic work throughout the UK and Hong Kong. Kadoorie and his brother, Horace, both received the Magsaysay Award for public service in 1962. They were also appointed Chevaliers of the Légion d'honneur by the French government. He also gave money to the Kahal Kadosh Mekor Haim (Holy Community Fountain of Life) to finish the construction of the Kadoorie Synagogue for the Anusim/Marranos in Oporto, Portugal.

Photography

Kadoorie was an enthusiastic amateur photographer, his photographs documented many aspects of the city and rural life of average Hongkongers in the 1950s. He took a slice of life approach on photography, regularly carried a camera with him as he went about daily life. His photographs covered streetscape and landscape, pedestrian, ferry commuters, labour at work, farmers with their live stock, hawkers and many other aspects of the old Hong Kong. His photograph collection was preserved by the Hong Kong Heritage Project, and was featured in photography exhibition "Eye of Hong Kong" in 2017.

Personal life
In 1938, Kadoorie married Muriel Gubbay, the daughter of Hebrew scholar David Sassoon Gubbay. They had two children: a son, Michael Kadoorie (heir to the family business) and a daughter Rita (who married a Scottish accountant). 

He died on 25 August 1993 and is buried in the Jewish Cemetery in Happy Valley, Hong Kong. His widow, Muriel, died in Hong Kong on 5 December 2011.

See also
Kadoorie family
Kadoorie Agricultural Aid Association

References

1899 births
1993 deaths
Jewish Chinese history
Hong Kong businesspeople
Hong Kong philanthropists
Hong Kong Jews
Hong Kong people of Iraqi-Jewish descent
Lawrence
Knights Bachelor
Life peers
Chevaliers of the Légion d'honneur
Commanders of the Order of the British Empire
People educated at Clifton College
Ramon Magsaysay Award winners
Jewish philanthropists
Members of the Legislative Council of Hong Kong
Hong Kong Basic Law Consultative Committee members
British politicians of Iraqi descent
20th-century philanthropists
Life peers created by Elizabeth II